This is a list of properties and districts in Bartow County, Georgia that are listed on the National Register of Historic Places (NRHP).

Current listings

|}

References

Bartow
Bartow County, Georgia
National Register of Historic Places in Bartow County, Georgia